"Read Your Mind"  is a song by American recording artist Avant. It was released for as the lead single from album Private Room.

Track listing
CD Single
Read Your Mind (Radio Edit) — 3:59
Read Your Mind (Album Version) — 4:14
Read Your Mind (Instrumental) — 4:24
Read Your Mind (A Cappella) — 5:00

Vinyl (Remix)
Read Your Mind (Extended Version) (featuring Snoop Dogg) — 5:11
Read Your Mind (Instrumental) — 4:24

Samples 
In 2017, Jacquees sampled the song in his song "B.E.D.".

Charts

Weekly charts

Year-end charts

References

2003 singles
Avant songs
Snoop Dogg songs
2003 songs
Geffen Records singles